The Solicitors Regulation Authority (SRA) is the regulatory body for solicitors in England and Wales.

It is responsible for regulating the professional conduct of more than 125,000 solicitors and other authorised individuals at more than 11,000 firms, as well as those working in-house at private and public sector organisations.

The SRA, based in Birmingham with an office in London, is led operationally by a Chief Executive and Senior Management Team, with a Board and Board Sub-Committees providing strategic direction.

The SRA was formed in January 2007 by the Legal Services Act 2007 to act as the independent regulator of solicitors. While formally an arm of the Law Society, the SRA is a statutory creation and operationally independent of the Law Society. In a report by Sir David Clementi of all legal services in England and Wales, he recommended that professional bodies holding both regulatory and representative responsibilities should separate those roles. The government adopted this recommendation.

The Law Society remains the representative body for solicitors.

Background 

The profession of solicitor has been self-regulated for centuries. The Law Society acquired its first Royal Charter in 1831 and the new Charter in 1845 defined the Society as an independent, private body servicing the affairs of the profession like other professional, literary and scientific bodies. In 1834, the Society first initiated proceedings against dishonest practitioners. By 1907, the Society possessed a statutory disciplinary committee, and was empowered to investigate solicitors' accounts and to issue annual practising certificates. In 1983, the Society established the Office for the Supervision of Solicitors to deal with complaints about solicitors.

Following the Clementi review, the SRA was formed as a Board of The Law Society, but it regulates and enforces regulation completely independently of the Law Society. It is not representative of, or responsive to, the profession, and it is headed by non-lawyers. The current Chief Executive, Paul Philip, is a career regulator who previously served the General Medical Council. This arrangement has produced the anomaly that in England and Wales, unlike most common law jurisdictions, solicitors are admitted by non-lawyers and receive admission certificates signed by a regulatory bureaucrat who is not a lawyer or a judge. The Law Society remains the approved regulator, although following the Legal Services Act 2007 a new body, the Legal Services Board (chaired by Sir Michael Pitt, a government appointee) oversees all the approved regulators including the Bar Council, which has also divested its regulatory functions into the Bar Standards Board.

Function 

The SRA regulates solicitors, other authorised professionals and the firms they work in throughout England and Wales. Scotland and Northern Ireland are separate legal jurisdictions and have their own regulatory regimes.

A solicitor is someone who carries out specific legal activities, having undergone specialist studies and training. These specific services are called reserved legal activities. In England and Wales, the current reserved legal activities are:

 Administration of oaths
 Advocacy
 Conveyancing
 Litigation
 Notary
 Probate

There are other regulators within England and Wales, who regulate other providers of legal services. The Bar Standards Board regulates barristers, for example, while the other regulators are:

 CILEx
 Notaries
 Council for Licensed Conveyancers
 Intellectual Property Regulation Board
 Costs Lawyer Standards Board
All regulators report to the overarching Legal Services Board. Regulatory work is designed to ensure all work in legal services achieves the eight regulatory outcomes.

These are:

 protecting and promoting the public interest
 supporting the constitutional principle of the rule of law
 improving access to justice
 protecting and promoting the interests of consumers
 promoting competition in the provision of services in the legal sector
 encouraging an independent, strong, diverse and effective legal profession
 increasing public understanding of citizens legal rights and duties
 promoting and maintaining adherence to the professional principles of independence and integrity; proper standards of work; observing the best interests of the client and the duty to the court; and maintaining client confidentiality

The SRA carries out its function by:

Creating and maintaining the Solicitors Handbook including the Code of Conduct, which contains the ethical principles that guide solicitors in their work
Authorising those that want to work in the profession, including the annual renewal of Practising Certificates that represent a solicitor’s licence to practise
Authorising the firms within which individuals carry out reserved legal activities
Supervising firms and individuals to ensure they adhere to professional standards
Taking enforcement action against those that have breached the code of conduct, to create an effective deterrent and discourage further wrongdoing in the profession. A range of sanctions are available to the SRA, including prosecuting more severe cases at the Solicitors Disciplinary Tribunal
Monitoring the quality of training both for those entering the profession and to further increase the standard of those practising within it

Regulating in the public interest 

The SRA regulates firms and individuals in the public interest. This means setting the minimum professional standards that solicitors should adhere to so their clients - as consumers - get the service they expect. When these standards are not met, professional sanctions are taken to act as a deterrent.

What regulating in the public interest does not mean, however, is acting as means of recourse for individuals that are unhappy with the actions of their solicitor or firm. While the SRA will deal with complaints brought to it by dissatisfied clients as necessary, it does not offer a compensation scheme. This can be achieved through the Legal Ombudsman.

Activity

Enforcement 

In 2012, the SRA's Supervision function handled a total of 6,289 issues, while the Forensic Investigations Unit began work on 530 new cases.

The number of interventions, which involves the SRA closing down a firm because it poses risks to clients, was 37. The number of referrals to the Solicitors Disciplinary Tribunal was 289, which resulted in 77 strike-offs, 94 fines and 56 suspensions, among other sanctions.

The Solicitors Compensation Fund accepted 1,321 claims and paid out £18.54 million for those which were successful.

Further information on the SRA's enforcement activity can be found on its Reports and Research pages

Outcomes-focused regulation 

In 2011, the SRA moved from a rules-based tick-box approach to regulation and introduced an outcomes-focused regime. This involved creating a whole new Handbook to create a regulatory framework in which law firms could deliver the best outcomes for their clients using a business model adapted specifically for their situation.

Research conducted at the end of 2012 showed that while the number of firms comfortable with the concept of outcomes-focused regulation had increased, the SRA still had work to do to demonstrate the flexibilities offered by the new way of working.

Alternative business structures 

The Legal Services Act also allowed for law firms to adopt management models that moved away from the traditional all-partner model. Alternative Business Structures (ABSs) were introduced on 6 October 2011, and the SRA began accepting applications for licences on 3 January 2012. The first licences were awarded on 28 March 2012.

Legal education and training review 

The SRA, in conjunction with the BSB and IPS, has delivered the Legal Education Training Review (LETR), the most comprehensive study on training for legal services in a generation. Each of the regulators will be producing their own response to the findings of the review.

Referral fees in personal injury cases 

As part of the Legal Aid, Sentencing and Punishment of Offenders Act 2012, the Government introduced a ban on the payment of referral fees in personal injury cases. Solicitors could no longer pay firms that passed them details of those who had suffered injuries as the Government felt this played a significant part in creating and maintaining the alleged compensation culture. The SRA was tasked with drawing up the rules to outlaw the payments and police the profession in conjunction with the Ministry of Justice and Financial Conduct Authority.

Despite the ban on referral fees, the practice of Claims Management Companies introducing injured clients to solicitors in exchange for a fee remains prevalent in the UK.

A matter of concern with regards to solicitors making payments in exchange for these introductions is the fact that, in many cases, the fee paid is in excess of the costs a solicitor can be paid by the losing party for the work done on some claims. This inevitability of this is that a solicitor must take up the option of deducting up to 25% from the customers compensation in order to cover costs and maintain profitability.

It is of note that the initial ability of solicitors to claim referral fees in personal injury cases was itself introduced by Government in order the ameliorate the effect of removal of access to Legal Aid for personal injury claims.

Financial stability 

The difficult economic climate brought about by the 2008 recession affected the legal sector in the same way that it affected all others. While some firms found new ways of working or cut their cloth accordingly, others failed to adapt to tighter financial constraints. This was brought into focus early in 2013 with a number of high-profile failures at large practices. The SRA started a programme of work to discover how deeply the financial difficulties lie, and help firms in trouble.

News International 

In July 2011 the SRA announced that it would be launching a formal inquiry into the role played by solicitors in the News International phone hacking scandal. The SRA confirmed that its investigation would consider the concerns of Labour MP Tom Watson, who had called upon the SRA to investigate News International's former legal adviser Harbottle & Lewis.

See also

Law Society of England and Wales
Legal Complaints Service

References

English law
Organisations based in Worcestershire
Organizations established in 2007
Law of the United Kingdom
Legal organisations based in the United Kingdom
Solicitors
Law societies
Legal organisations based in England and Wales
2007 establishments in the United Kingdom
Self-regulatory organisations in the United Kingdom
Legal regulators of the United Kingdom